A Matter of Fat is a 1969 documentary film produced by the National Film Board of Canada and directed by William Weintraub. It chronicles the efforts of a 358-pound man, Gilles Lorrain, to lose half his body weight as part of a hospital supervised weight loss program.

In the film, which is narrated by Lorne Greene, Lorrain recounts his life and experiences, often with humour. In one 21-second time lapse sequence, Weintraub shows Lorrain's 150-pound weight loss, filmed at two frames a day for seven months. The film also shows Lorrain's return to his family after the gruelling program, and his conviction that he will be one of one in four dieters who can keep the weight off.

In addition to focusing on Lorrain's story, the film explores what other obese people are doing to lose weight, and hears from medical authorities on misconceptions and practices in the weight loss industry. A Matter of Fat also motivated the film's director to lose weight.

Awards
 22nd Canadian Film Awards, Toronto: Best Film Over 30 Minutes, 1970
 Atlanta Film Festival, Atlanta: Gold Medal, 1971
 Atlanta Film Festival, Atlanta: Special Jury Award, 1971
 American Film and Video Festival, New York: Blue Ribbon, 1971

See also
Fat Chance, a 1994 NFB documentary about obesity

References

External links
Watch A Matter of Fat at NFB.ca

1969 films
Documentary films about obesity
National Film Board of Canada documentaries
Best Theatrical Short Film Genie and Canadian Screen Award winners
1969 documentary films
Canadian documentary films
Films scored by Robert Fleming
1960s English-language films
Films directed by William Weintraub
1960s Canadian films